The American Power Boat Association (APBA) is an American membership-owned corporation. In 1903, New York's Columbia Yacht Club had formulated a constitution for what ultimately became the APBA. It is the United States sanctioning authority for the Union Internationale Motonautique, the world governing body for powerboat racing. Headquartered in Eastpointe Michigan, the APBA has over 3,500 active members and sanctions over 150 races nationwide. The APBA sanctions all types of power boat racing from 205+ mph Unlimited Hydroplanes to smaller Junior Class racing starting at age 9.

Hall of Champions 
Each year, the association inducts powerboat drivers into its "Hall of Champions". 
2009 induction
2010 induction

Footnotes

External links Past Champion Mike Quindazzi
American Power Boat Association official website

Motorboat racing
Personal water craft
Maritime safety
H1 Unlimited
Power boating
Sports organizations of the United States